The 2012–13 2. národní hokejová liga season was the 20th season of the 2nd Czech Republic Hockey League, the third level of ice hockey in the Czech Republic. 30 teams participated in the league, and VSK Technika Brno, AZ Havířov, and HC Tábor qualified for the qualification round of the 1st Czech Republic Hockey League.

Regular season

Group: Center

Group: East

Group: West

Playoffs

Group: Center

VSK Technika Brno proceeded directly to the qualification round of the 1st Czech Republic Hockey League after winning their final series. They qualified for the 1st Czech Republic Hockey League.

Group: East

AZ Havířov proceeded directly to the qualification round of the 1st Czech Republic Hockey League after winning their final series. They qualified for the 1st Czech Republic Hockey League.

Group: West

HC Tábor proceeded directly to the qualification round of the 1st Czech Republic Hockey League after winning their final series. They qualified for the 1st Czech Republic Hockey League.

2. Liga Promotion - Qualification

Group A

Group B

Group C
HC Orlová (Moravian champion) won Group C automatically as the winners of the South Moravian and Zlin regional championships declined to participate.

2. Liga Promotion

West
 HC Milevsko 2010 - HC Slavoj Zbraslav 9:2 (4:0, 2:0, 3:2)
 HC Slavoj Zbraslav - HC Milevsko 2010 3:5 (2:3, 1:1, 0:1)

Central
HC Lvi Chotěboř - HC Stadion Vrchlabí 3:5 (0:2, 3:1, 0:2)
HC Stadion Vrchlabí - HC Lvi Chotěboř 7:3 (1:2, 3:1 3:0)

East
HC Bobři Valašské Meziříčí - HC Orlová 3:4 (OT) (1:0, 2:2, 0:1 - 0:1)
HC Orlová - HC Bobři Valašské Meziříčí 0:7 (0:0, 0:4, 0:3)
HC Bobři Valašské Meziříčí - HC Orlová 3:2 (1:2, 1:0, 1:0)

External links 
 Hokej.cz
 http://www.eliteprospects.com/

3
Czech 2. Liga seasons